This is a list of immovable cultural properties of Rožaje. The locations according to the numbers are given on the image on the right.

See also
Sultan Murat II Mosque
Kučanska Mosque

References

Rožaje
Sandžak
Cultural heritage
Cemeteries in Montenegro
Montenegrin culture
Rozaje